Jeremiah "Jer" Dwyer (1854 – ?) was an Irish hurler who played for the Tipperary senior team.

Dwyer made his first appearance for the team during the inaugural championship of 1887. During that successful year he won one All-Ireland medal.

At club level Dwyer was a one-time county club championship medalist with Thurles.

References

1854 births
Thurles Sarsfields hurlers
Tipperary inter-county hurlers
All-Ireland Senior Hurling Championship winners
Year of death missing